The tuberculum sellae (or the tubercle of the sella turcica) is a part of the sphenoid bone that is an elevation behind the chiasmatic groove. A variable slight to prominent median elevation forming the posterior boundary of the chiasmatic groove and the anterior boundary of the hypophysial fossa.

Additional Images

References

External links
 
 Diagram at uni-mainz.de

Bones of the head and neck